Baron Lyell, of Kinnordy in the County of Forfar, was a title in the Peerage of the United Kingdom. It was created in 1914 for the Scottish Liberal politician Sir Leonard Lyell, 1st Baronet. He had already been created a baronet, of Kinnordy in the County of Forfar, in 1894. As his son Charles, a Liberal Member of Parliament, died on 18 October 1918 of pneumonia while serving as Assistant Military Attaché to the USA, he was succeeded by his grandson, the second Baron. He was posthumously awarded the Victoria Cross for his actions in North Africa during the Second World War. He was succeeded in the titles by his son, the third Baron, in 1943. He was one of the ninety elected hereditary peers that remain in the House of Lords after the passing of the House of Lords Act 1999, and sat on the Conservative benches. The titles became extinct on his death in 2017.

The first Baron Lyell was the nephew of the geologist Sir Charles Lyell, 1st and last Baronet, of Kinnordy.

Barons Lyell (1914)
Leonard Lyell, 1st Baron Lyell (1850–1926)
Charles Anthony Lyell, 2nd Baron Lyell (1913–1943)
Charles Lyell, 3rd Baron Lyell (1939–2017)

See also
Lyell baronets of Kinnordy

Notes

References

Kidd, Charles, Williamson, David (editors). Debrett's Peerage and Baronetage (1990 edition). New York: St Martin's Press, 1990, 

Extinct baronies in the Peerage of the United Kingdom
Noble titles created in 1914
Noble titles created for UK MPs